The 2015–16 Coastal Carolina Chanticleers men's basketball team represents Coastal Carolina University during the 2015–16 NCAA Division I men's basketball season. The Chanticleers, led by ninth year head coach Cliff Ellis, play their home games at the HTC Center and are members of the Big South Conference.

Roster

Schedule

|-
!colspan=9 style="background:#008080; color:white;"| Regular season

|-
!colspan=9 style="background:#008080; color:white;"| Big South tournament

|-
!colspan=9 style="background:#008080; color:white;"| CIT

References

Coastal Carolina Chanticleers men's basketball seasons
Coastal Carolina
Coastal Carolina